List of newspapers in Washington may refer to:

 List of newspapers in Washington (state)
 List of newspapers in Washington, D.C.